The Strathendrick and Aberfoyle Railway was a railway line in Scotland.

The line was operated by the North British Railway and then, after 1923, by the London and North Eastern Railway. Unable to compete in the face of road competition, the line was closed to passengers by British Railways in 1951 and completely in 1959.

History

On 12 August 1880 the Strathendrick and Aberfoyle Railway was authorised to extend the Blane Valley Railway to Aberfoyle, running for part of the way between Gartness Junction and Buchlyvie Junction over the metals of the Forth and Clyde Junction Railway which had opened in 1856, and was also operated by the North British Railway. The line opened two years later on 1 August 1882. A new station a little nearer the village took on the Killearn name, with the existing Blane Valley Railway Killearn station renamed  after the celebrated hill of that name. A focus for the line was very much on visitors coming to see the natural beauty of the area, the Trossachs, and Loch Katrine, which had been popularised by Sir Walter Scott since the 1810s.

This route had originally been proposed in the plans for the Blane Valley Railway, but had not been pursued when money had fallen short. Plans had also called for the railway to be extended along Loch Ard towards Inversnaid on Loch Lomond, but this was blocked by the objections of the major landowner in the area, the Duke of Montrose.

The Strathendrick and Aberfoyle Railway was absorbed by the North British Railway by Act of Parliament on 5 August 1891.

Closure
By summer 1950 Aberfoyle was being served by three trains a day. The line was closed to passengers the next year, on 1 October 1951. Both the Forth and Clyde Junction Railway and Strathendrick and Aberfoyle Railway closed completely eight years later.

References

Notes

Sources
 
 

North British Railway
Closed railway lines in Scotland
Railway companies established in 1880
Railway companies disestablished in 1891
Railway lines opened in 1882
1880 establishments in Scotland
Transport in Stirling (council area)
British companies established in 1880